Better Than Chocolate is a 1999 Canadian romantic comedy film shot in Vancouver and directed by Anne Wheeler.

Plot

Maggie (Karyn Dwyer) has moved out on her own and has started a relationship with Kim (Christina Cox). Maggie's mother Lila (Wendy Crewson) and brother are forced to move into her loft sublet with her, but unaware that she is a lesbian. Maggie's freedom is compromised, and she believes she must keep her blossoming affair a secret. The clandestine romance introduces Maggie's family to a host of new experiences, many of which are "better than chocolate". The story features Judy, a friend of Maggie's who is a transgender woman. Judy develops a friendship with Maggie's Mom and helps her to repair her relationship with her daughter. Judy's love interest is Frances, owner of the book shop in which Maggie works and purveyor of LGBT literature.

Cast
 Karyn Dwyer as Maggie
 Christina Cox as Kim
 Peter Outerbridge as Judy
 Ann-Marie MacDonald as Frances
 Wendy Crewson as Lila, Maggie's Mom
 Kevin Mundy as Paul, Maggie's Brother
 Marya Delver as Carla
 Tony Nappo as Tony
 Jay Brazeau as Mr. Marcus
 Beatrice Zeilinger as Bernice
 Veena Sood as Religious Zealot

Background 
The film was created with a budget of $1.6 million. It was co-produced by Peggy Thompson and Sharon McGowan.

The film takes its name from a lyric in Sarah McLachlan's song "Ice Cream", "Your love is better than chocolate". Veena Sood, the sister of McLachlan's then-husband Ashwin Sood, has a small role in the film as a religious protester.

The plot line about the bookstore is a fairly direct reference to Vancouver's Little Sister's Book and Art Emporium and its travails with Canada Customs.  The bookstore is thanked in the credits. Ann-Marie MacDonald, who plays the bookstore's owner, is a well-known Canadian author.

The movie poster, which shows two women embracing and one woman's naked back, was banned by the Hong Kong Television and Entertainment Licensing Authority as it was deemed "offensive to public morality, decency and ordinary good taste."  An advertisement in the San Diego Union-Tribune was also removed, due to the word "lesbian" being present on the movie poster.

Soundtrack
The soundtrack of the film was released as a CD in 1999 on Lakeshore Records.
Track listing
 Sexy - West End Girls
 When I Think Of You - Melanie Dekker
 32 Flavors - Ani DiFranco
 Julie Christie - Lorraine Bowen
 Perfect Fingers - Tami Greer
 Let's Have Sex - Studio Kings 2.0/Trippy
 In My Mind - Trippy
 My Place - Edgar
 I'm Not A Fucking Drag Queen - Peter Outerbridge
 Stand Up - Ferron
 Night - Feisty
 Long Gone - Kelly Brock
 Pure (You're Touching Me) - West End Girls

Reception
 

Stephen Holden of the New York Times gave the film a positive review and wrote: "the movie gushes with so much romantic optimism and good humor that it has the effervescence of an engaging musical comedy".

Awards
The film screened at film festivals around the world and was ranked 31st on The Hollywood Reporters Top 200 independent films list of 1999.

See also
 List of LGBT films directed by women

References

External links

 Better Than Chocolate at the Canadian Film Reference Library
 
 

1999 films
1990s English-language films
Canadian romantic comedy films
English-language Canadian films
Lesbian-related films
Canadian LGBT-related films
Films about trans women
1999 romantic comedy films
Films set in Vancouver
Films shot in Vancouver
Films directed by Anne Wheeler
1999 LGBT-related films
LGBT-related romantic comedy films
Trimark Pictures films
1990s Canadian films